Maurice Ronet (13 April 1927 – 14 March 1983) was a French film actor, director, and writer.

Early life
Maurice Ronet was born Maurice Julien Marie Robinet in Nice, Alpes Maritimes. He was the only child of professional stage actors Émile Robinet and Gilberte Dubreuil. He made his stage debut at the age of 14 alongside his parents in Sacha Guitry's Deux couverts in Lausanne. After attending the Parisian acting school Centre du Spectacle de la Rue-Blanche, he entered the Paris Conservatoire in 1944, where Jean-Louis Barrault was one of his mentors. When he made his film debut at 22 in Jacques Becker's Rendez-vous de juillet (1949) in a role that was written specifically for him by Becker, he had little interest in pursuing an acting career.

After completing the film, he married Maria Pacôme (a French stage actress and playwright), and they departed to Moustiers-Sainte-Marie in Provence, where he tried his hand at ceramics. After completing his military service, he returned to Paris in the early 1950s where he took courses in philosophy and physics, and pursued his passion for literature, music (piano and organ), film and painting. His artwork, part of the peinture non figurative movement, was exhibited with friends Jean Dubuffet and Georges Mathieu. He also acted occasionally in small roles in the films of French directors like Yves Ciampi and René Wheeler, with ambitions of becoming a filmmaker himself. Gradually, however, he came to discover a freedom in acting and a creative satisfaction that provided a synthesis of all his interests.

Career
Maurice Ronet became one of European cinema's more prolific actors. Between 1955 and 1975 he appeared in over 60 films. He often portrayed characters who were in conflict with themselves or society. He first garnered acclaim at the 1953 Cannes Film Festival for a supporting role in Jean Dreville's Endless Horizons (Horizons sans fin) and over the next few years as the romantic lead in André Michel's La sorcière (The Blonde Witch/The Sorceress, 1956) and in Jules Dassin's  He Who Must Die, (Celui qui doit mourir, 1957). It was at the presentation of "La Sorcière" at Cannes where he met a creative and an intellectual counterpart in Louis Malle. Two years later, he made his international box-office breakthrough as Julien Tavernier in Malle's first feature film Elevator to the Gallows (Ascenseur pour l'échafaud 1958), which features Jeanne Moreau. He originated the role of Philippe Greenleaf  in Purple Noon (Plein soleil, 1960), René Clément's adaptation of The Talented Mr. Ripley .

Ronet's defining role reunited him with Malle and Moreau in Le feu follet (The Fire Within, 1963). Playing an alcoholic writer, his indelible portrayal of depression and suicide garnered him the highest acclaim of his prolific career. He was awarded France's Crystal Star (Étoile de Cristal) and the prize for Best Actor at the 1965 São Paulo Film Festival; the film also won a Special Jury Prize at the 1963 Venice Film Festival. He also collaborated with Claude Chabrol in four films, including The Champagne Murders (Le scandale, (1966), for which he won the Best Actor award at the 1967 San Sebastián International Film Festival, Line of Demarcation (La ligne de démarcation, 1966) and The Unfaithful Wife (La femme infidèle, 1968). He co-starred with Alain Delon and Romy Schneider in The Swimming Pool (La Piscine, 1969) directed by Jacques Deray.

Other highlights include Jacques Doniol-Valcroze The Immoral Moment (1962); The Victors (Carl Foreman, 1963); Three Rooms in Manhattan (Trois chambres à Manhattan, (Marcel Carné, 1965); Lost Command (Mark Robson, 1966);  (1967); How Sweet It Is! (Jerry Paris, 1968) starring Debbie Reynolds; Raphaël ou le débauché, (Michel Deville, 1971); Beau-père (Bertrand Blier, 1981) and, one of his final films, Bob Swaim's La Balance, 1982. He was originally cast as Ali in Lawrence of Arabia. However, he was replaced on location by Omar Sharif because of perceived difficulties with his accent.

Ronet made his directorial debut with The Thief of Tibidabo (Le voleur de Tibidabo, 1964), a self-reflexive, picaresque crime story shot in Barcelona, in which he also starred with Anna Karina. He followed it with two documentaries: Vers l'île des dragons (1973), an allegorical journey to Indonesia to film the Komodo dragon and a report on the building of a dam in Cabora Bassa, Mozambique for French television. He directed and produced more programs for television: his own acclaimed adaptation of Herman Melville's Bartleby in 1976 (which was released theatrically in 1978) as well as adaptations of Edgar Allan Poe and Cornell Woolrich stories. He wrote two books: "L'ile des dragons" (1973), a personal recollection and a chronicle of the making of Vers l'île des dragons, and "Le métier de comédien" (1977), an honest and thorough discussion of the acting profession.

Personal life
His marriage to Maria Pacôme quickly ended in a separation, and they divorced in 1956. In 1966 he constructed his home in the village of Bonnieux, Vaucluse, Provence-Alpes-Côte d'Azur. He lived there, and in Paris, with Josephine Chaplin from 1977 until his death; their son Julien was born in 1980. He died in a Paris hospital, of cancer, aged 55. He is buried at the cemetery near his home.

Selected filmography

Rendezvous in July (1949, director: Jacques Becker) as Roger Moulin
Great Man (1951) as François
The Seven Deadly Sins (1952) as Le curé (segment "Luxure, La / Lust")
Desperate Decision (1952) as Jim
Endless Horizons (1953, director: Jean Dréville) as Marc Caussade
La môme vert-de-gris (1953) as Mickey
Lucrèce Borgia (1953) as Perotto
Le Guérisseur (1953, director: Yves Ciampi) as André Turenne
El torero (1954) as Miguel Murillo
House of Ricordi (1954) as Vincenzo Bellini
Casta Diva (1954) as Vincenzo Bellini
Gueule d'ange (1955) as Gueule d'Ange
Les aristocrates (1955) as Christophe de Conti
La Sorcière (1956, director: André Michel) as Laurent Brulard
 (1956, director: Pierre Chenal) as Juan Milford
He Who Must Die (1957, director: Jules Dassin) as Michelis
Elevator to the Gallows (1958, director: Louis Malle) as Julien Tavernier
Carve Her Name with Pride (1958, director: Lewis Gilbert) as Jacques
 That Night (1958,) as Jean Mallet
Ce corps tant désiré (1959, director: Luis Saslavsky) as Henri Messardier
A Girl Against Napoleon (1959, director: Tulio Demicheli) as José
Purple Noon (1960, director: René Clément) as Philippe Greenleaf
Il peccato degli anni verdi (1960, director: Leopoldo Trieste) as Paolo Donati
My Last Tango (1960) as Dario Ledesma
 (1961,) as Philippe
 (1962, director: Roger Leenhardt) as Pierre Neyris
Liberté I (1962, director: Yves Ciampi) as Michel
 (1962, director: Jacques Doniol-Valcroze) as Michel Jussieu
Portrait-robot (1962) as Gilbert Vitry
Le Meurtrier (1963, director: Claude Autant-Lara) as Walter Saccard
Storm Over Ceylon (1963, director: Gerd Oswald) as Dr. Gérard Rinaldi
The Fire Within (1963, director: Louis Malle) as Alain Leroy
Casablanca, Nest of Spies (1963, director: Henri Decoin) as Maurice Desjardins
The Pit and the Pendulum (1964, TV Movie, director: Alexandre Astruc) as Le condamné à mort
The Victors (1963, director: Carl Foreman) as French Lieutenant
Les Parias de la gloire (1964, director: Henri Decoin) as Ferrier
Donde tú estés (1964) as Paul Vallier
Circle of Love (1964, director: Roger Vadim) as Henri
The Thief of Tibidabo (1965, director: Maurice Ronet) as Nicolas
Three Rooms in Manhattan (1965, director: Marcel Carné) as Francois Comte
La Longue Marche (1966, director: Alexandre Astruc) as Le docteur Chevalier
Line of Demarcation (1966, director: Claude Chabrol) as Pierre, comte de Damville
Lost Command (1966, director: Mark Robson) as Capain. Boisfeuras
Amador (1966) as Amador
The Champagne Murders (1967, director: Claude Chabrol) as Paul Wagner
The Road to Corinthe (1967, director: Claude Chabrol) as Dex
 (1967,) as Carlo
Un Diablo bajo la almohada (1968, director: José María Forqué) as Lotario
Spirits of the Dead (1968) as Récitant (voice, uncredited)
Birds in Peru (1968, director: Romain Gary) as Rainier
How Sweet It Is! (1968, director: Jerry Paris) as Phillipe Maspere
The Unfaithful Wife (1969, director: Claude Chabrol)
La Piscine (1969, director: Jacques Deray) as Harry
Delphine (1969, director: Éric Le Hung) as Jean-Marc
The Scarlet Lady (1969,) as François
Les Femmes (1969, director: Jean Aurel) as Jérôme
Last Leap (1970, director: Édouard Luntz) as Garal
La modification (1970) as Léon Delmont
 (1970,) as Serge
Splendori e miserie di Madame Royale (1970, director: Vittorio Caprioli) as Commissario
Un peu, beaucoup, passionnément... (1971, director: Robert Enrico) as Didier
Raphael, or The Debauched One (1971, director: Michel Deville) as Raphaël de Lorris
The Deadly Trap (1971, director: René Clément) as L'homme de l'organisation
 (1972,) as Marc Fontemps
Les Galets d'Étretat (1972, director: Sergio Gobbi) as Kelvo
Il diavolo nel cervello (1972, director: Sergio Sollima) as Fabrizio Garces
La Chambre rouge (1972, director: Jean-Pierre Berckmans) as Jean Gerfaud
 (1973, director: Bruno Gantillon) as Raoul Maury
Don Juan, or If Don Juan Were a Woman (1973, director: Roger Vadim) as Pierre Gonzague
L'Affaire Crazy Capo (1973,) as Diserens
La seduzione (1973, director: Fernando Di Leo) as Giuseppe Lagana
Commissariato di notturna (1974,) as Vittorio Cazzaniga
The Marseille Contract (1974, director: Robert Parrish) as Inspector Briac
 (1974,) as Mathieu, le père d'Alexandre
Only the Wind Knows the Answer (1974, director: Alfred Vohrer) as Robert Lucas
 (1975, director: Beni Montresor) as David
To the Bitter End (1975, director: Gerd Oswald) as Paul Jordan
Jackpot (1975)
Perché si uccidono (1976, director: Mauro Macario)
 (1976,) as Luigi
Golden Night (1976, director: Serge Moati) as Nuit d'or
 (1976,) as Claude Landot
The French Woman (1977, director: Just Jaeckin) as Pierre
Death of a Corrupt Man (1977, director: Georges Lautner) as Philippe Dubaye
Bloodline (1979, director: Terence Young) as Charles Martin
Sphinx (1981, director: Franklin J. Schaffner) as Yvon Mageot
Beau-père (1981, director: Bertrand Blier) as Charly
La guérilléra (1982) as Brutus
Un matin rouge (1982) as Henri
La Balance (1982, director: Bob Swaim) as Roger Massina
Surprise Party (1983) as Georges Levesques (final film role)

References

External links

 

1927 births
1983 deaths
Deaths from cancer in France
French male film actors
French film directors
Chaplin family
20th-century French male actors
Male actors from Nice, France
20th-century French military personnel